Gabriel I may refer to:
 
Pope Gabriel I of Alexandria, ruled in 910–920
Gabriel I of Constantinople, Ecumenical Patriarch in 1596
Gabriel Bethlen (1580–1629), King of Hungary